The Christopher Page House is a historic First Period house in Bedford, Massachusetts.  The  story timber-frame house was built c. 1730, exhibiting construction techniques that are transitional between First Period and Georgian practice.  The main block is five bays wide with a large central chimney, and an added leanto section.  A leanto dormer was added in the late 19th century, as was the Colonial Revival front porch.  The interior and exterior both received stylistic treatment during the Federal period.

The house was listed on the National Register of Historic Places in 1990.

See also
National Register of Historic Places listings in Middlesex County, Massachusetts

References

Houses on the National Register of Historic Places in Middlesex County, Massachusetts
Houses in Bedford, Massachusetts